Tibetan Foothold is a book by Irish author Dervla Murphy. It was first published by John Murray in 1966.

Summary

After her journey by bicycle from Ireland to India in 1963, as described in Full Tilt: Ireland to India with a Bicycle, Murphy immerses herself in the life of the subcontinent. 
She works for six months in an orphanage for Tibetan children in Northern India, falling in love with the "Tiblets": the children of the new Tibet-in-exile. Murphy also explores India's Tibetan frontier.

Editions
 1966: John Murray, 206pp.
 1969: Pan Books, 222pp, .
 2000: Flamingo, 230pp, .
 2011: Eland Books, 224pp, .

References

External links
 

1966 non-fiction books
Eland Books books
John Murray (publishing house) books
Books by Dervla Murphy